Temuka is a town on New Zealand's Canterbury Plains, 15 kilometres north of Timaru and 142 km south of Christchurch. It is located at the centre of a rich sheep and dairy farming region, for which it is a service town. It lies on the north bank of the Temuka River, just above its confluence with the Opihi River.

Temuka is the second largest town in South Canterbury after Timaru. Temuka is home to three schools, two primary schools and one secondary school. Temuka is accessed by New Zealand's State Highway Number 1 and the Main South Line railway allowing for major cargo handling. Temuka is north of the Opihi and Temuka rivers. The local secondary school, Opihi College, takes its name from the Opihi River. Both rivers are popular with locals and tourists. Almost all traffic passing north or south goes through or around Temuka. Temuka has recently had the redevelopment of the local Domain by incorporating a skate park to join the other facilities which include a swimming pool, mini golf, golf, netball, outdoor bowls and tennis. There are also rugby and football fields, a stadium complex and a holiday park.

History and culture

The fierce ovens would be the large earth ovens that Māori used to cook the roots of plentifully-growing cabbage trees. 

Temuka was a stop on the Main South Line until passenger services were discontinued. At one time Temuka supported wool scouring plants, it had a flour mill and manufactured electric power transmission insulators.

Temuka previously had its own council system in place, but has been under the administration of Timaru District Council since 1989. Recently, the council has been redeveloping Temuka in the form of cleaning waterways, new walkways, redeveloping of existing walkways, new gardens, domains, new tennis courts, complete skate park and general modernisation of the large service town.

Marae

Arowhenua marae, a marae (tribal meeting ground) of Ngāi Tahu and its Te Rūnanga o Arowhenua branch, is located south of Temuka. It includes Te Hapa o Niu Tireni wharenui (meeting house).

In October 2020, the Government committed $50,232 from the Provincial Growth Fund to upgrade the marae, creating 16 jobs.

Demographics
Temuka is described by Statistics New Zealand as a small urban area.

Temuka had a population of 4,470 at the 2018 New Zealand census, an increase of 216 people (5.1%) since the 2013 census, and an increase of 225 people (5.3%) since the 2006 census. There were 1,911 households. There were 2,205 males and 2,265 females, giving a sex ratio of 0.97 males per female, with 789 people (17.7%) aged under 15 years, 678 (15.2%) aged 15 to 29, 1,917 (42.9%) aged 30 to 64, and 1,083 (24.2%) aged 65 or older.

Ethnicities were 90.0% European/Pākehā, 12.1% Māori, 1.5% Pacific peoples, 3.5% Asian, and 1.7% other ethnicities (totals add to more than 100% since people could identify with multiple ethnicities).

The proportion of people born overseas was 10.2%, compared with 27.1% nationally.

Although some people objected to giving their religion, 50.3% had no religion, 39.0% were Christian, 0.7% were Hindu, 0.1% were Muslim, 0.1% were Buddhist and 1.1% had other religions.

Of those at least 15 years old, 228 (6.2%) people had a bachelor or higher degree, and 1,260 (34.2%) people had no formal qualifications. The employment status of those at least 15 was that 1,749 (47.5%) people were employed full-time, 495 (13.4%) were part-time, and 81 (2.2%) were unemployed.

Education

There are currently three primary and secondary schools in Temuka.

Temuka Primary School is a contributing primary for years 1 to 6 with a roll of  students. A public school for both primary and secondary students opened in 1866, and moved to the current site in the late 1870s. The secondary school moved to a separate site in 1968.

St. Joseph's School is a Catholic state-integrated full primary for years 1 to 8 with a roll of  students. The school opened in 1883.

Opihi College is a secondary school for years 7 to 13 with a roll of  students. It was originally called Temuka District High School, then Temuka High School when it moved to its current site, and in 2005 the name was changed to Opihi College.

All these schools are coeducational. Rolls are as of

Business
Temuka is home to a large trucking company, Temuka Transport. This company has about 40 trucks which are used to service the South Canterbury area. Also located in the town is Temuka Homeware. This company produces ceramic crockery. Currently, the older and traditional items are seeing an increase of demand from collectors and the accompanying industry. Located in Temuka are various businesses including supermarkets, takeaways, collectors, hardware stores, office supply stores, and art galleries.

Temuka is home to New Zealand Insulators (NZI), the major supplier of insulators to New Zealand's power industry. Temuka houses NZI's corporate headquarters, South Island warehouse, and local factory. Temuka is also home to the only bagpipe bag manufacturing business in New Zealand, Gannaway New Zealand, manufacturing cowhide, goatskin, and sheepskin bagpipe bags exported worldwide.

Notable residents
Rachel Armitage (1873–1955), welfare worker
Ned Barry (1905–1993), rugby union player
Horace Edward Manners Fildes (1875–1937), postmaster, book collector and bibliographer
John Lister (born 1947), professional golfer
Richard Pearse (1877–1953), aviation pioneer
Hipa Te Maihāroa (?–1886), tribal leader, tohunga and prophet
Jeremiah Twomey (1847–1921), member of the New Zealand Legislative Council
Lachie Grant (1923–2002), rugby union player

References

External links

 Temuka Information & Services
 Timaru District Council page on Temuka
 Tourism website for the central South Island of New Zealand
 Destination New Zealand, Temuka
 Opihi College

Timaru District
Populated places in Canterbury, New Zealand